The Center for the Study of Science and Religion (CSSR) is a center inside The Earth Institute at Columbia University. It was founded in the summer of 1999 as a forum for the examination of issues that lie at the boundary of these two complementary ways of comprehending the world and our place in it. By examining the intersections that cross over the boundaries between one or another science and one or another religion, the CSSR hopes to stimulate dialogue and encourage understanding. The founder and director of CSSR is Robert Pollack, Professor of Biological Sciences and Adjunct Professor of Science and Religion at Union Theological Seminary in the City of New York and also Adjunct Professor of Religion at Columbia University.

CSSR offers courses, varying in length and content, for undergraduates, graduate students, clergy, and professional students.

CSSR sponsors one major symposium about every two years, and four or more guest lectures each semester. CSSR symposia have included:

 Mind and Reality, February 25 & 26, 2005
 Love and its Obstacles, November 7, 2004
 Destructive Emotions: Neuroscience, Psychology and Buddhism, January 28, 2003
 A Colloquium on the Centennial of William James's The Varieties of Religious Experience, March 24 & 25, 2002

CSSR and Columbia University Press oversee publication of the Columbia Series in Science and Religion.

References

External links
Center for the Study of Science and Religion
CSSR Blog

Columbia University